Juan Vítola was an Argentine theater and film actor.

Career
Vítola (also billed as Juan Vittola) was well-known in Argentina's theater scene and as a cinematic actor of that country's golden age. He shared the stage with important figures of the day such as Tulia Ciámpoli, Irma Córdoba, Eloy Álvarez, Enrique Muiño, Rosa Rosen, Arturo García Buhr, and María Esther Podestá.

Theater
Vítola was a dedicated theatrical actor. His best-known works included
 Veraneamos en bañadera
 El barrio está de fiesta
 Se acabaron los otarios
 El mago de Palermo
 Te quiero porque sos reo
 Sierra chica
 Yo soy un tipo de línea
 Caferata 
 Los muchachos de antes fumaban Avanti

In 1945 he appeared in the Teatro Odeón work Claudia with Delia Garcés, Enrique Álvarez Diosdado, Milagros de la Vega, María Luisa Fernández, Eduardo Navega, Alita Román, and Margarita Corona.

Filmography
 Internado (1935)
  (1936)
  (1937)
 Melgarejo (1937)
  (1938)
 El Gran camarada (1938)
 Con el dedo en el gatillo (1940)
 Delirio (1944)

References

External links
 

Year of birth missing
Year of death missing
Argentine male film actors
Argentine male stage actors
Male actors from Buenos Aires